André Boniface (born 14 August 1934) is a former international rugby union player for France. His usual position was either on the wing or in the centres. His Test career for France, 1954 through to 1966, included 48 caps and 44 points. Boniface was inducted into the International Rugby Hall of Fame in 2005. Both he and his younger brother Guy Boniface were inducted into the IRB Hall of Fame in March 2011.

References

External links
 
 

1934 births
Living people
Sportspeople from Landes (department)
French rugby union players
Rugby union centres
Rugby union wings
World Rugby Hall of Fame inductees
France international rugby union players